Francis Holmes Hull (1816– 13 July 1884) was a 19th-century Member of Parliament in the Auckland Region, New Zealand.

He represented the Marsden electorate from  until he resigned. Parliament received his resignation on 1 June 1869.

References

1816 births
1884 deaths
Members of the New Zealand House of Representatives
New Zealand MPs for North Island electorates
19th-century New Zealand politicians